John Maxwell Homa (born November 19, 1990) is an American professional golfer who plays on the PGA Tour. In college, he won the individual 2013 NCAA Division I Men's Golf Championship. As a professional he has won six times on the PGA Tour.

Early and personal life
Homa was born in Burbank, California. He is Jewish. In December 2018, he tweeted: "Despite 6 years of Hebrew school and the completion of my Bar Mitzvah, the most Jewish I've ever felt came after looking at a home with extravagant Christmas lights and immediately thinking ‘that electric bill must be brutal.’” In November 2019, he married Lacey Croom, and the couple lives in Scottsdale, Arizona with their dog, Scotty.

High school and college
Homa attended Valencia High School in the Santa Clarita Valley. There, he was a four-time first-team All-Foothill League selection, and 2009 Foothill League MVP, graduating in 2009.

He then played college golf at University of California, Berkeley on scholarship, earning a degree in Consumer Behavior. There, as a junior in 2011-12 Homa was a third-team PING Division I All-American and second-team All-Pac-12 and PING Division I All-West Region. As a senior in 2012-13 he was ranked No. 19 nationally by Golfweek (5/19) and No. 22 according by Golfstat (5/21), was first-team All-Pac-12, ranked No. 17 on the final Palmer Cup Ranking, and won the Pac-12 Championship with an opening-round nine-under par 61 breaking the course record at the North Course at Los Angeles Country Club and tying for the lowest round posted in the U.S.  He was named a first-team All-American and to the All-Nicklaus Team by the Golf Coaches Association of America.

Amateur career
In 2008, Homa was selected to represent Southern California on the Junior America's Cup team.  In 2009, he won the Ventura County Junior Golf Association Robinson Ranch (72-73=145).

In 2010, he reached the quarterfinals of the U.S. Amateur before losing to reigning champion and Cal teammate An Byeong-hun. Homa ended the year ranked 4th in California, 33rd in the U.S., and 78th in world according to amateurgolf.com.

In 2011, Homa won the amateurgolf.com Silicon Valley Amateur (63-70=133). He ended the year ranked 8th in California, 36th in the U.S., and 89th in the world according to amateurgolf.com. In 2012, he ended the year ranked 5th in California, 18th in the U.S., and 50th in the world according to amateurgolf.com.

Homa competed as an amateur at the 2013 U.S. Open, and won the individual 2013 NCAA Division I Men's Golf Championship. He was selected to the 2013 Walker Cup squad, and turned pro after the event.

Professional career
In October 2013, Homa finished T-9 at the Frys.com Open, his first PGA Tour event as a pro. In December 2013, he tied for 6th place in the Web.com Tour qualifying school. In May 2014, he earned his first professional win at the Web.com Tour's BMW Charity Pro-Am, defeating fellow rookie Jonathan Randolph by one stroke, earning $117,000. He finished 17th on the Web.com Tour regular-season money list, to earn his PGA Tour card for the 2014–15 season.

In the 2015 PGA Tour season, Homa entered 27 events. He made 12 cuts and won $380,339. He finished 163rd in the FedEx Cup standings and lost his tour card. In the 2016 Web.com Tour season, Homa won the Rust-Oleum Championship in Ivanhoe, Illinois, coming from seven shots back, and ultimately regained his PGA Tour Card for the 2016–17 season.

In the 2017 PGA Tour season, Homa made only two cuts in 17 events and lost his card. That year he made just $18,008.  In 2017 he tweeted: "Had a few caddies hit me up recently hoping to team up. They heard they usually get weekends off which is apparently a great selling point."

In the 2018 Web.com Tour season, Homa regained his PGA Tour card for the 2019 PGA Tour season.

On May 5, 2019, Homa won the Wells Fargo Championship for his first PGA Tour victory, with a three-shot victory over Joel Dahmen. Homa received $1.422 million for his win, a two-year extension of his PGA Tour card, as well as spots in the PGA Championship and in the 2020 Masters Tournament.

On February 21, 2021, Homa earned his second PGA Tour victory at the Genesis Invitational in a playoff over Tony Finau.

In September 2021, Homa won his third PGA Tour title at the Fortinet Championship, the opening event of the 2021–22 season. In May 2022, Homa won the Wells Fargo Championship for a second time. He ended the season finishing in a tie for 5th at the Tour Championship.

In September 2022, he successfully defended the Fortinet Championship, chipping-in for a birdie on the final hole to beat Danny Willett by one stroke. He was selected to play on the U.S. team in the 2022 Presidents Cup; he won all four of the matches he played.

In January 2023, Homa won the Farmers Insurance Open. He came from behind with a final round six-under par 66 for a two shot victory over Keegan Bradley.

Amateur wins
2013 NCAA Division I Championship

Professional wins (8)

PGA Tour wins (6)

PGA Tour playoff record (1–0)

Web.com Tour wins (2)

Results in major championships
Results not in chronological order in 2020.

CUT = missed the half-way cut
"T" = tied for place
NT = No tournament due to COVID-19 pandemic

Summary

Most consecutive cuts made – 4 (2021 Open – 2022 U.S. Open)
Longest streak of top-10s – 0

Results in The Players Championship

CUT = missed the halfway cut
"T" indicates a tie for a place

Results in World Golf Championships

1Cancelled due to COVID-19 pandemic

NT = No tournament
"T" = Tied
Note that the Championship and Invitational were discontinued from 2022.

U.S. national team appearances
Amateur
Walker Cup: 2013 (winners)

Professional
Presidents Cup: 2022 (winners)

See also
2014 Web.com Tour Finals graduates
2016 Web.com Tour Finals graduates
2018 Web.com Tour Finals graduates

See also
List of Jewish golfers

References

External links

American male golfers
California Golden Bears men's golfers
PGA Tour golfers
Korn Ferry Tour graduates
Jewish golfers
Jewish American sportspeople
Golfers from California
Golfers from Scottsdale, Arizona
Sportspeople from Burbank, California
People from Valencia, Santa Clarita, California
1990 births
Living people
21st-century American Jews